ARTZUID is an international large-scale sculpture exhibition which takes place every two years in Amsterdam.

ARTZUID was established in 2008. The initiative came from United Art Consult led by Cintha van Heeswijck. From 2009 on, the exhibition takes place every odd year in the monumental Art-Deco district in Amsterdam, designed in 1917 by Hendrik P. Berlage. ARTZUID sculpture route starts at the Museum Square in front of the Rijksmuseum and stretches for 2,5 kilometers south along the Minervalaan, the Apollolaan and finally up to the Station Zuid.

Over a period of 4 months, 60 sculptures of established and emerging artists form an eye-catching spectacle. The biennial is attended by an average of  375,000 visitors.

 ARTZUID 2009: The first free accessible exhibition was called Berlage in Sculptures. The curator was Michiel Romeyn. His choice of art was based on the history of the neighborhood. Antoine Poncet, at that time president of the Académie Française, opened the exhibition. It was supported by international galleries, the Rijksakademie, Dutch company collections, artists and museums like the Stedelijk Museum. The event attracted 90,000 visitors.
 ARTZUID  2011: The second edition of ARTZUID was called The World Around - Equality in Diversity and opened by Queen Beatrix. Curator Jan Cremer, a leading writer and artist, mixed European sculptures with works by artists from Brazil, Surinam, India, Ghana, China, Indonesia, the US, and more to reflect the mixed population of Amsterdam. Artists from 21 countries participated with fifty-eight sculptures from various artists like Anthony Caro, Jean Tinguely, Anthony Gormley, Marcel Pinas, Salvador Dalí, Ryas Komu, Lu Shengzhong, Eko Prawoto, Thomas Houseago, Jaume Plensa, Atelier van Lieshout, Subodh Gupta, Yayoi Kusama, Jean Dubuffet, Rodin, Dennis Oppenheim, Ugo Rondinone, Joost Conijn etc.
 ARTZUID 2013: The theme of the third exhibition was Engagement. Foundation ArtZuid, together with curator Henk van Os, professor of Art and Society at the University of Amsterdam, decided to "shake up assumptions and suppositions", demonstrating how engagement unites artists from all continents. Moreover, all the sculptures were meant to add meaning to the so-called Plan Zuid  ("South Plan")  of architect Hendrik Petrus Berlage.
 ARTZUID 2015: Amsterdam, City of Sculptures was the title of the fourth edition of the exhibition and it was curated by Rudi Fuchs, former director of the Stedelijk Museum. This time, the open-air sculpture route in Amsterdam attracted more than 500,000 visitors. The highlights of the exhibition were: Tony Cragg's bronze works, Mimmo Paladino's statues, KAWS' cartoon figures, Jaume Plensa's monumental sculptures.
 ARTZUID 2017: The celebration of the fifth edition ARTZUID was shared with 100th anniversary of De Stijl movement. This time Rudi Fuchs chose Dutch abstraction, "the great new revelation of modern art", to be a theme which connected all the sculptures placed in the 2,5 kilometer route in South Amsterdam. Artists that participated in this exhibition were Klaas Gubbels, Arne Quinze and Esther Tielemans, and the Atelier van Lieshout also contributed to the sculpture route.

 ARTZUID 2019 marked the 6th edition of the sculpture route and was called The Sculptures, The Figurations, The Garden & The Spectacle. It was curated by art historian and retired art critic Jhim Lamoree and visual artist Michiel Romeyn, who themed the exhibition around figuration in modern and contemporary art, as well as putting emphasis on the adornment of the South Amsterdam area called Plan Zuid. ARTZUID 2019 was organized by the curators to be a reflection on the impact of modern art and sculpture on artists today, and how they use this history to be critical of their own foundations. Artists such as Yoshitomo Nara, Marc Quinn, Gloria Friedmann, Ai Weiwei, Takashi Murakami and Nancy Rubins participated in this edition of ARTZUID, each presenting their personal understanding of art history and the place of figuration within contemporary art. The Stedelijk Museum also participated and exhibited works of Henry Moore within the sculpture bienal. 

 ARTZUID 2021 was curated by Ralph Keunig, a Dutch Art historian and was titled Imagine. Artists such as Sarah Lucas, Joanneke Meester, Ugo Rondinone, KAWS, Erwin Wurm and Sokari Douglas Camp participated in this edition of ARTZUID.
 The next installation of the Amsterdam Sculpture Bienal will be ARTZUID 2023, marking it's 8th edition and the 15th anniversary of the Foundation. The curator of this exhibition is artist and TV personality Jasper Krabbé, and the theme being explored is pop'art, neo-pop'art, and street art.

Beelden Magazine 
Artzuid also published a sculpture magazine names Beelden Magazine. It is a magazine that is published four times a year, since 2011. Artzuid took this task upon themselves to share and promote sculptures that are active in the art world, as well as the galleries and museums that present their work.

Awards
Foundation ArtZuid won the Europa Nostra Award in 2011 for making a hidden cultural heritage site known to a broad public.

References

Further reading
Opening of ArtZuid in 2011 
Article on The New York Times blog (2009)

External links

Sculpture exhibitions